Olfactory receptor family 11 subfamily H member 7 (gene/pseudogene) is a protein that in humans is encoded by the OR11H7 gene.

Function 

In most humans, OR11H7 is a pseudogene, meaning it does not result in the creation of a functional olfactory receptor protein that binds to specific odorants. Some individuals, however, carry a single-nucleotide polymorphism on one or both chromosomes which transforms it from a pseudogene into an intact gene, and they are significantly more likely to exhibit hyperosmia to the chemical isovaleric acid. Isovaleric acid was shown to be a ligand of OR11H7.

References 

Olfactory receptors